Osvaldas is a Lithuanian masculine given name. It is a cognate of the name Oswald. Notable people with the name include:

Osvaldas Balakauskas (born 1937), Lithuanian composer 
Osvaldas Jablonskis (born 1944), Lithuanian painter
Osvaldas Matulionis (born 1991), Lithuanian basketball player
Osvaldas Olisevičius (born 1993), Lithuanian basketball player
Osvaldas Pikauskas (1945-1995), Lithuanian-born Soviet and Russian military leader

Lithuanian masculine given names